The men's shot put event at the 2007 Summer Universiade was held on 14 August.

Results

References
Results
Final results

Shot
2007